Rakh Jhok Forest (Punjabi) is the first smart forest in Punjab, Pakistan's Sheikhupura District, at the Rakh Jhok area on the Ravi River. Ten million trees are planned to be planted in the forest for the first time in Pakistan.

See also
 Changa Manga

References

Forests of Pakistan
Sheikhupura District
Wildlife sanctuaries in Punjab, Pakistan
Wildlife sanctuaries of Pakistan
Protected areas of Punjab, Pakistan